The NWA World Television Championship is a world television championship owned and promoted by the American professional wrestling promotion National Wrestling Alliance (NWA). The inaugural champion was Ricky Starks. The current champion is Thom Latimer
, who is in his first reign.

On December 14, 2019, the NWA announced they were reintroducing the NWA World Television Championship with a tournament to determine a new champion. Although past Television champions from both the Georgia and Mid-Atlantic versions have been referred to on NWA programming, the original titles and respective lineage are currently owned by WWE.

History

On December 14, 2019, during NWA's Into the Fire pay-per-view, it was announced they were reintroducing the NWA World Television Championship with a tournament to determine a new champion at their next PPV, Hard Times, on January 24, 2020. On the December 17 episode of NWA's weekly flagship program, NWA Power, it was revealed that all NWA World Television Championship tournament matches would have a 6 minute, 5 second time limit. The time limit was an homage to the 6:05 PM start time of NWA Power as well as a tribute to the original start time for NWA's World Championship Wrestling that ran from the 1970s to 1992. All tournament competitors, as well as two qualifying matches, were then announced. On the January 7 episode of NWA Power, Tim Storm clarified that six competitors would move on to the first round of the NWA World Television Championship tournament. He also announced there would be two additional spots open in the first round for competitors yet to be named and not currently on the NWA roster. The tournament bracket was unveiled on the January 14 episode of NWA Power. On the January 21 episode of NWA Power, the final two competitors in the first round of the tournament were named: Matt Cross from the independent circuit and Dan Maff from Ring of Honor.

On the January 28, 2020 episode of NWA Power, the "Lucky Seven Rule" was announced. A champion who successfully defends the championship 7 consecutive times will be eligible to trade in the championship for a match for the NWA Worlds Heavyweight Championship. On March 21, 2021 at Back For The Attack, the NWA extended the time limit for World Television title matches on pay-per-views to ten minutes.

Hard Times tournament

Belt design

The current design is the same that Jim Crockett Promotions used from April 1985 to November 1988. It is also the same design World Championship Wrestling used from November 1988 to January 1991 and for the WCW World Television Championship belt from January 1991 to May 1992. The design uses a dual-colored leather strap (black front, red back) as the base. The main plate is nickel silver with a red background for the words “NWA Television Heavyweight Wrestling Champion.” An eagle’s head and wings sit underneath the “NWA” letters, a globe is etched in the silver underneath “Television,” and a wrestling ring with two figures is etched in the silver underneath “Heavyweight Wrestling Champion.” There are four side plates. On the left are the logos of two of the major television networks: NBC and ABC. On the right, the logo of the television network CBS is on one plate while an image of a satellite dish is on the other. The belt was also available in red and white straps.

Reigns 

References

External links 
 NWA Television Championship History at Cagematch.net

National Wrestling Alliance championships
Television wrestling championships
2019 establishments in the United States
World professional wrestling championships